Akihiro Macieira Sato (born September 12, 1983) is a Japanese Brazilian model.

Early life
Akihiro Sato was born on September 12, 1983 to Ichiro Sato and Clea Maceda Andrade in São Paulo, Brazil. His mother is a Brazilian of Portuguese, African, and Indigenous descent, while his father is Japanese Brazilian. He has an older brother and an older sister.

Career

Modeling and acting
Sato started modeling in Brazil and Thailand. He appeared in a Filipino movie called Handumanan. He is one of the most popular models in the Philippines as of 2009. He joined Survivor Philippines: Celebrity Showdown and made it all the way to the end, Day 36 with Ervic Vijandre, Solenn Heussaff, and Aubrey Miles as the shows "Final Four". In the live finals, he was named as the "1st Celebrity Sole Survivor".

Sato also appeared in GMA Network shows like SRO Cinemaserye: Moshi Moshi I Love You, with Rufa Mae Quinto as his leading lady; in Darna as Vladimir the Vampire, one of Darna's enemies; and in Panday Kids as Oswaldo.

In 2011, Sato played the role of Tommy in the movie My Valentine Girls. He appeared in Captain Barbell as Bruno.

When his contract with GMA Network expired, Sato moved to ABS-CBN due to lack of TV shows. Sato appeared in Trip na Trip as a new host.

Football
Sato signed up to play for Team Socceroo F.C. of the now-defunct United Football League for the 2011 season. He played with actor models, Daniel Matsunaga and Fabio Ide.

Personal life
Sato studied the Filipino language in the University of the Philippines. He is good friends with his fellow Japanese Brazilian model-turned-actors Daniel Matsunaga and Fabio Ide.

Sato is now based in Brazil, where he lives with his girlfriend. Their daughter, Mayumi, was born on January 28, 2013.

Television

Film

References

Brazilian male models
Brazilian male film actors
1983 births
Living people
Brazilian people of Japanese descent
Brazilian people of Lithuanian descent
Brazilian people of Russian-Jewish descent
Brazilian people of Portuguese descent
Brazilian expatriate sportspeople in the Philippines
Brazilian footballers
Brazilian expatriate footballers
Survivor (franchise) winners
Brazilian expatriate sportspeople in Thailand
Brazilian male television actors
21st-century Brazilian male actors
GMA Network personalities
ABS-CBN personalities
Participants in Philippine reality television series
Survivor Philippines contestants
Team Socceroo F.C. players
Male actors of Japanese descent
Association footballers not categorized by position
Footballers from São Paulo
Winners in the Survivor franchise